Jason Andrew Varitek (born April 11, 1972), nicknamed Tek, is an American professional baseball coach and former catcher. He is currently the game planning coordinator, a uniformed coaching position, for the Boston Red Sox. After being traded as a minor league prospect by the Seattle Mariners, Varitek played his entire 15-year career in Major League Baseball (MLB) for the Red Sox. A three-time All-Star and Gold Glove Award winner at catcher, as well as a Silver Slugger Award winner, Varitek was part of both the 2004 World Series and 2007 World Series Championship teams, and was viewed widely as one of the team's leaders. In December 2004 he was named the captain of the Red Sox, only their fourth captain since 1923. He was a switch-hitter.

Varitek is one of only three players, along with pitcher Ed Vosberg and outfielder Michael Conforto, to have played in the Little League World Series, College World Series, and Major League World Series.  He additionally participated in Olympic Baseball and the World Baseball Classic. His Lake Brantley High School baseball team won the Florida State Championship his senior year in 1990 and was named the number one high school baseball team in the nation by a USA Today poll. Varitek caught an MLB-record four no-hitters, a record which was later tied by Carlos Ruiz.

Little League career
Varitek played in the 1984 Little League World Series, leading his Altamonte Springs, Florida, team to victory in the United States Championship bracket in a 4–2 victory over Southport, Indiana.

High school and college
Varitek was Lake Brantley High School's third baseman and relief catcher. Brantley's first line catcher was Jerry Thurston, himself a pro prospect. In 1990, the Patriots won the state championship.

Varitek attended Georgia Tech, where he helped lead the Yellow Jackets baseball team to the 1994 College World Series title game, along with future Red Sox teammates Nomar Garciaparra and Jay Payton (they lost to the University of Oklahoma). In 1994, he received the Baseball America College Player of the Year Award, and won the Dick Howser Trophy for National Collegiate Player of the Year. Varitek graduated from Georgia Tech with a degree in management and is the only Tech baseball player to have his number (33) retired.

In 1991 and 1993, Varitek played collegiate summer baseball in the Cape Cod Baseball League (CCBL) for the Hyannis Mets. In 1993, he hit .371 for Hyannis, won the league batting title, and was named the league's MVP. In 2002, he was inducted into the CCBL Hall of Fame. Varitek was a member of the U.S. national baseball team at the 1992 Summer Olympics.

Early professional career
Varitek was drafted 21st overall in the first round by the Minnesota Twins in 1993, but opted to return for his senior year of college. Following graduation, Varitek signed with agent Scott Boras and was drafted by the Seattle Mariners in the first round of the  amateur draft, with the 14th pick overall. A pioneer of the loopholes in the draft process, Varitek signed with the St. Paul Saints in the independent Northern League before agreeing to terms with the Mariners, and consequently did not enter the Mariners' minor league system until . When he finally did join the franchise, Varitek was sent to the AA affiliate Port City Roosters where he first met pitcher and longtime teammate Derek Lowe. He was traded with Lowe to the Red Sox during the  season in return for reliever Heathcliff Slocumb, often cited as one of the best trades in the Red Sox's favor in recent history.

Major league career

1997–2004

Varitek was called up for a single game on September 24, 1997, collecting a single in his only at bat. During the 1998 season, Varitek split time with incumbent catcher Scott Hatteberg, playing in 86 games. Varitek showed signs of things to come in the season, and with a strong spring training the following season, Varitek earned the starting catcher position.

The year  was a breakout season for the catcher. Varitek played in 144 games, hitting for a .269 average, with 20 home runs and 76 RBIs. Varitek went 5–21 with 3 RBI in the 1999 ALDS against the Cleveland Indians and 4–20 with 1 RBI in the ALCS against the New York Yankees. During the ALDS, he set a postseason record by scoring five runs in a single game.

Looking forward to building more success from the year before, the 2000 season was a disappointment offensively, producing a .248 average with only 10 home runs and 65 RBI, as the Red Sox failed to qualify for post-season play. Prior to the  season, Varitek signed a three-year, $14.9 million contract with Boston. Varitek went on a hitting hot streak, having a .310 average at one point and on May 20, 2001, he homered three times in a single game before a broken left elbow injury sidelined the catcher for nearly the rest of the season, as Varitek dove to catch a foul ball on June 7. The play went on to be a top Web Gem for the month of July 2001. Varitek finished the season with a .293 average, seven home runs, and 25 RBI in 51 games played.

Varitek returned to the Red Sox lineup full-time in the  season. The return did not go smoothly, however, as Varitek struggled to find himself at the plate. Despite not reaching his full offensive potential, pitchers and coaches alike began to notice how much Varitek's preparation and knowledge of the game was helping the pitchers. His study habits and extra hours of work with pitchers would soon become his defining attribute. Varitek and the Red Sox entered the  season with a renewed fire to reach the playoffs after missing in the previous three years. Varitek instantly became a leader in the clubhouse which management tried to portray as working class, featuring new faces such as Kevin Millar, David Ortiz, Bill Mueller, and Todd Walker along with original players Trot Nixon and Lou Merloni. The 2003 season was Varitek's best to date and he earned his first All-Star selection after the fans voted him in with the All-Star Final Vote. He was hitting .296 with 15 home runs and 51 RBI going into the All-Star break and finished the season off with a solid .273 average, 25 home runs and 85 RBI, all career highs. The Red Sox earned a Wild Card berth and their first playoff appearance since 1999, before losing the 2003 ALCS to the Yankees.

In , Varitek compiled a career-high .296 batting average with 18 home runs and 73 RBI. During a nationally televised game on July 24, Varitek shoved his glove into the face of the Yankees' Alex Rodriguez after Rodriguez was hit by a pitch and gestured towards pitcher Bronson Arroyo, causing a bench-clearing brawl. Though he was ejected (along with Rodriguez) from the game following the incident, the Red Sox, spurred on by the fight, came from behind to win 11–10. It is also sometimes regarded as the turning point in the Red Sox' season, as they posted MLB's best record after the melee. Boston culminated the season with its first World Series championship in 86 years, after being the first MLB team to overcome a three games to none deficit, doing so in the ALCS against the Yankees. Varitek went 3-for-4 in the crucial Game 6 (the "Bloody Sock game" of the ALCS which Boston won 4-2.

At the end of the year, Varitek became a free agent and signed a four-year, $40-million contract with the Red Sox.

2005–2011

After Varitek's re-signing the Red Sox appointed him team captain, only the fourth Red Sox player so honored since 1923, following Hall of Famers Jimmie Foxx (–), Carl Yastrzemski ( and –) and Jim Rice (–). At the time, Varitek was one of just three captains in MLB (the others were Derek Jeter of the New York Yankees and Paul Konerko of the Chicago White Sox). Varitek remained captain until his retirement before the 2012 season. Varitek wore a "C" patch on his uniform, making him the first player to do so in a World Series.

In , Varitek won his first Gold Glove Award, his first Silver Slugger, and his second All-Star selection.

In , Varitek represented the United States in the World Baseball Classic, playing in three games. He made the most of his playing time, hitting a grand slam against Team Canada allowing Team USA to narrow an 8–2 lead down to 8–6. Team Canada, however, kept the lead in the upset victory.

On July 18, 2006, Varitek played his 991st game at catcher for the Boston Red Sox, breaking Carlton Fisk's club record. That game was a home game vs. Kansas City, during which Varitek's achievement was recognized before the bottom of the fifth inning (after the game was official and couldn't be cancelled due to weather). Varitek received a standing ovation from the sellout crowd at Fenway Park for a few moments before play resumed. On July 31, 2006, Varitek was injured rounding the bases in a 9–8 victory over the Cleveland Indians (his 1,000th career game as catcher), but said he believed the initial injury to the knee occurred while he was blocking home plate to make the tag against the Angels Mike Napoli on July 29, 2006. He had surgery on August 3, 2006, to repair torn cartilage in his left knee. Varitek returned to the Red Sox lineup on September 4, following a short rehabilitation assignment in Pawtucket.

On September 19, 2006, Varitek was honored during a pre-game ceremony as the first Red Sox catcher to catch 1,000 games. He was presented with a special award by Hall of Famer Carlton Fisk, who held the Boston club record with 990 career games caught before Varitek surpassed it. Varitek caught his 1,000th game on July 31 and by the evening of the ceremony had appeared in 1,009 games behind the plate. That same night, Varitek also received the 2006 Red Sox Heart and Hustle Award from the local chapter of the Major League Baseball Players Alumni Association, which is presented to a player exemplifying the values, tradition, and spirit of the game of baseball.

In 2007, Varitek and the Red Sox returned to the World Series, winning for the second time in four years. During the season, Varitek recorded his 1,000th career hit. On May 19, 2008, he caught Jon Lester's no-hitter, giving him a Major League record of having caught four separate no-hitters in his career.

In honor of being captain, Varitek released Captain Cabernet, a charity wine with proceeds benefiting Pitching In For Kids and Children's Hospital Boston.

At the end of the 2008 season, Varitek opted for free agency.
Reports in the Boston Globe suggested that his agent, Scott Boras, was using New York Yankee catcher Jorge Posada's four-year, $52.4 million deal as a benchmark for negotiations. On February 6, 2009, Varitek signed a new one-year deal with the Red Sox worth $5 million with a $5 million club option, or a $3 million player option, for 2010.
During the 2009 season, Varitek's numbers were similar to his dismal 2008 season, with slightly more home runs (14), doubles (24) and runs batted in (51), and a higher slugging percentage (.390) despite a lower batting average (.209) and fewer at bats (425). He eventually became the backup catcher when the Red Sox acquired All-Star Victor Martinez on the July 31 trade deadline.

On December 2, 2010, Sports Illustrated reported that Varitek signed a one-year, $2 million deal to stay with the Red Sox for the 2011 season.  The deal was finalized on December 10. With the addition of Jarrod Saltalamacchia, Varitek usually came off the bench during the 2011 season, playing in 68 games, hitting .221 with 11 home runs, 36 RBI, with a .300 on-base percentage.

After the 2011 season, Varitek became a free agent once again, and was offered a minor league contract, with an invitation to spring training, by the Red Sox.  On March 1, 2012, at Jet Blue Park in Fort Myers, Florida, Varitek officially announced his retirement.

Ryan Lavarnway, fellow catcher and teammate of Varitek in 2011, listed the Boston veteran as his favorite player growing up. "Varitek has set the gold standard for the position, catching four no-hitters and winning two World Series. He’s a true professional in handling a pitching staff and is something I’d like to become as my career progresses."

Post-playing career
On September 27, 2012, then-Red Sox general manager Ben Cherington announced that Varitek had been named special assistant to the general manager.  In that role, Cherington said Varitek would be involved in areas such as "major league personnel decisions, evaluations, and mentorship and instruction of young players." His role by March 2018 was "Special Assistant to the President of Baseball Operations". After not appearing in the team's front-office directory during the 2019 season, in 2020 he was listed as "Special Assistant / Catching Coach". On November 20, 2020, Varitek was named to a uniformed coaching role, that of game planning coordinator, on the coaching staff of manager Alex Cora. His title was changed to Player Information Coach prior to the start of the 2021 season.

Records and awards

Georgia Tech records 
 Most career games played (253)
 Most career runs scored (261)
 Most career base hits (351)
 Most career doubles (82)
Source:

College awards and achievements
 His number 33 is only the second number ever retired by Georgia Tech; the first was number 44, worn by Coach Jim Luck
 Baseball America's 1993 player of the year
 Named by Baseball America to "All-Time College All-Star Team"
 1994 Golden Spikes Award
 1994 Rotary Smith Award
 1994 Dick Howser Trophy
 Three-time consensus All-American (1992, '93, '94)
 Inducted into Georgia Tech Hall of Fame
 Inducted into Cape Cod Baseball League hall of fame
 1994 College World Series runner-up

MLB career
 Three-time All-Star (2003, 2005 and 2008), one-time starter (2005)
 Two-time World Series champion (2004, 2007)
 2005 Silver Slugger Award winner
 2005 Gold Glove winner
 2006 Heart and Hustle Award
 Has caught four no hitters, a record now shared with Carlos Ruiz. * Ruiz has 1 team no hitter and 3 solo no hitters.
 Only catcher to catch four no-hitters by four different starting pitchers.

Red Sox milestones and achievements 
 Became 26th player to hit 100 home runs for club on April 14, 2005
 Third Red Sox catcher to win a Gold Glove (Carlton Fisk and Tony Peña)
 First Red Sox at any position to win Gold Glove since Tony Peña in 1991
 1,488 games caught – most in 106-year Red Sox history – breaking Fisk's club record of 990 on July 18, 2006 vs. Kansas City
 Has caught a Major League record four official no-hitters
 Hideo Nomo: April 4, 2001, vs Baltimore
 Derek Lowe: April 27, 2002, vs Tampa Bay
 Clay Buchholz: September 1, 2007, vs Baltimore (Buchholz's no-hitter was his second Major League start)
 Jon Lester: May 19, 2008, vs Kansas City
 Does not count the five-inning, rain-shortened no-hit game by Devern Hansack in 2006 (which is not considered an official no-hitter).
 Most postseason home runs for a catcher (11)
 One of only six catchers to have at least two triples in the playoffs (2)
 Has played in more postseason games than any other Red Sox player.
 Most opening-day starts for a Red Sox catcher
Source:

Notable firsts
 In the 2004 World Series, Varitek batted against the St. Louis Cardinals' Jason Marquis, the first time two former Little League World Series participants have faced each other in the Major League Baseball World Series. Varitek had played for Altamonte Springs, Florida, in 1984.

Personal life
, Varitek identified as an evangelical Christian.

Varitek has three daughters from his previous marriage: Ally, Kendall and Caroline. He and his first wife, Karen Mullinax, divorced in 2008. He married Catherine Panagiotopoulos on November 26, 2011, and their first child, Liv, was born on May 26, 2012. They reside in Hingham, Massachusetts.

See also

 1992 College Baseball All-America Team
 1993 College Baseball All-America Team
 Boston Red Sox Hall of Fame
 List of Boston Red Sox award winners
 List of Georgia Institute of Technology athletes
 List of Major League Baseball career games played as a catcher leaders
 List of Major League Baseball career putouts as a catcher leaders
 List of Major League Baseball players who spent their entire career with one franchise
 List of people from Detroit

References

Further reading

External links

1972 births
2006 World Baseball Classic players
Living people
All-American college baseball players
American evangelicals
American League All-Stars
Boston Red Sox coaches
Boston Red Sox personnel
Boston Red Sox players
Baseball players at the 1992 Summer Olympics
Baseball players from Florida
Baseball players from Michigan
Georgia Tech Yellow Jackets baseball players
Gold Glove Award winners
Golden Spikes Award winners
Hyannis Harbor Hawks players
Lake Brantley High School alumni
Major League Baseball catchers
Olympic baseball players of the United States
Pawtucket Red Sox players
People from Rochester, Michigan
Port City Roosters players
Silver Slugger Award winners
Tacoma Rainiers players
World Baseball Classic players of the United States
National College Baseball Hall of Fame inductees